Port Nelson is a settlement in Newfoundland and Labrador.

Formerly known as Loo Cove and sometimes (incorrectly) as Loon Cove, the community of Port Nelson has now been abandoned.

Ghost towns in Newfoundland and Labrador